Celebrity Treasure Island 2022 is the sixth celebrity edition and the 12th season overall of the New Zealand reality-television series Treasure Island which returned to Ngātaki, Northland, New Zealand. This season premiered on 5 September, and aired weekly, Monday to Wednesday, at 7:30 PM on TVNZ 2 and TVNZ+; hosted by Matt Chisholm and Bree Tomasel. One of the twenty-one celebrities won a grand prize of $100,000 for their chosen charity.

Jesse Tuke won the treasure hunt on Day 27 and took $100,000 for Live Ocean. Courtney Louise and Elvis Lopeti were the other two finalists. This season raised $205,000 across 14 various charities across New Zealand.

Castaways

Eighteen celebrities were initially separated into three tribes with te reo Māori names based on flora and fauna of New Zealand: Kauri (Agathis australis), Kuaka (Bar-tailed godwit) and Mangō (Great white shark), including the merged tribe as Toroa (a Southern royal albatross). 

This season was the first not to incorporate the show's pirate theme tradition in the game-play and introduced three celebrities (Dame Susan Devoy, Mike King and Ron Cribb) entered the competition subsequently as intruders on Day 2, Day 4 and Day 7 respectively.

On Day 1, the twenty-second contestant was honoured as part of the cast. Former All Black Va'aiga 'Inga' Tuigamala travelled to the filming location with the rest of the cast but left for health reasons and subsequently died. His chosen charity was awarded $5,000. On Day 9, Ron Cribb won the individual charity challenge and announced that he competed for two charities instead of one; (Stand for Children) & former All Blacks Inga's charity (Alliance Health Plus).

Challenges

 The contestant was eliminated after their first time in the elimination challenge.
 The contestant was eliminated after their second time in the elimination challenge.
 The contestant was eliminated after their third time in the elimination challenge.
 The contestant was eliminated after the fourth or more time in the elimination challenge.

References

External links

Official Instagram 
Official Podcasts 

TVNZ original programming
2022 New Zealand television seasons
New Zealand game shows
New Zealand reality television series
TVNZ 2 original programming
Television shows filmed in New Zealand
Television shows set in New Zealand